VMRO – People's Party (VMRO–Narodna Partija), fully the Internal Macedonian Revolutionary Organization – People's Party, is a national-conservative political party in North Macedonia, formed by the followers of the former Prime Minister Ljubčo Georgievski who split from the VMRO–DPMNE. The VMRO–NP was founded in Skopje on 4 July 2004. Vesna Janevska was elected as the party's first chairwoman.

The VMRO–NP was founded as an alternative to VMRO-DPMNE, as part of a disagreement with many of the policies of Ljubčo Georgievski's successor, Nikola Gruevski. The VMRO–NP's statute allowed dual membership in both parties. Its party program closely resembles that of the VMRO–DPMNE.

In the 2006 parliamentary election, VMRO–NP won 6.1% of the vote and 6 seats in the Assembly. In the 2011 parliamentary election, VMRO–NP received 28,500 votes (2.51%), losing all of its seats. VMRO–NP remained an extra-parliamentary party until the 2020 parliamentary election, when it participated in the We Can alliance led by the Social Democratic Union of Macedonia and won one seat.

See also
:Category:VMRO – People's Party politicians

References

External links
Official web site of the VMRO–NP

Political parties established in 2004
Conservative parties in North Macedonia
2004 establishments in the Republic of Macedonia
Eastern Orthodox political parties
National conservative parties
People's Party
Pro-European political parties in North Macedonia
Christian democratic parties in Europe